Tafasir Al Quran (Persian: تفاسیر قرآن) are collections of books as commentaries on the Quran, written by Mulla Sadra.

Mulla Sadrā 

Ṣadr ad-Dīn Muḥammad Shīrāzī, also called Mulla Sadrā (also spelled Molla Sadra, Mollasadra or Sadr-ol-Mote'allehin) (c. 1571/2 – 1640), was an Iranian Shia Islamic philosopher, theologian and ‘Ālim who led the Iranian cultural renaissance in the 17th century.  According to Oliver Leaman, Mulla Sadra is arguably the single most important and influential philosopher in the Muslim world in the last four hundred years. Mulla Sadra brought "a new philosophical insight in dealing with the nature of reality" and created "a major transition from essentialism to existentialism" in Islamic philosophy, although his existentialism is not to be readily compared to Western existentialism. His was a question of existentialist cosmology as it pertained to Allah, and thus differs considerably from the individual, moral, and/or social, questions at the heart of Russian, French, German, or American Existentialism. Mulla Sadra's philosophy synthesized Avicennism, Shahab al-Din Suhrawardi's Illuminationist philosophy, Ibn Arabi's Sufi metaphysics, and the theology of the Ash'ari school and Twelvers.

Commentries
Among Quran commentaries, Sadra's interpretation are considered eminent and valuable. His  interpretation of the Quran covers only some of the verses and chapters. Sadra first showed a linguistic and semantic discussion in the beginning of every chapter and verse. He refers to philosophical problems in the verse and afterwards tries to explain it. He marks the beginning  of his interpretation of each verse with the main title and names the successive  stages of his philosophical discussions with secondary titles such as  "inspirational unveiling", "explanation and expansion", "merciful wisdom", and  "note".

According to Fazl Al Rahman, Sadra's religious works were written probably after maturing his philosophical thought. Hosein Nasr marks the commentaries as an important sample of hermeneutic and esoteric interpretation.

These interpretations are based on philosophical, gnostic and intuitive approaches. In fact these interpretations written during the different parts of his life. This collection, which amounts to 8 volumes, is among the Shia heritages of Tafsir.

Contents 
The first part is concerned with the interpretations of Surat Fatiha  al-Kitab. Mulla Sadra there referred to hadiths and other resources for interpreting these Surah. The second part is concerned with  the interpretation of chapter al-Baqarah from verse 1 to verse 22. According to Sadra, God created everything in the universe of form and its equivalents in the universe of meaning.

The third and fourth volumes were concerned with chapters of Baqarah. Sadra interpreted the 45 verse, referring to meaning and concept of transmigration and its explanations. He mentioned the aims of the verse.

In the fifth volume, Sadra interpreted two eminent verses, namely Ayat al-Kursi and Ayat an-Noor. He reminded those who do not care about the meaning of Verses that changing the concepts of words lead to confusions. Therefore According to him, we mjust interpret Quran in the same way that ordinary people understand it. In the interpretation  of verse an-Noor, Mulla Sadra examined problems such as the meaning of light and other subjects.

He discusses the  interpretation of as-Sajda and al-Hadid chapters in the sixth volume. He tried to follow his methods applied in interpreting the other verses, beginning with semantic subjects and considering philosophical problems.

He devoted his 7th and 8th volumes to the interpretation of Chapter Ya-seen. The other commentaries by Sadra are as follows: Interpretation on Surah 56 (al-Waqi'ah), Surah 57 (Al-Hadid); Surah 62 (al-Jumu'ah); Surah 65 (al-Talaq); Surah 86 (al-Tariq); Surah 87 (al-A'la); Surah 93 (al-Duha) and Surah 99 (al-Zilzal).

References

Shia tafsir
Sufi tafsir